ASC may refer to:

Educational institutions
 Anglican Schools Commission, Australia
 Andres Soriano Colleges of Bislig, located in Surigao del Sur, Philippines
 Agnes Scott College, Decatur, Georgia

Organizations

Australia
 Australian Singing Competition
 Australian Sports Commission
 ASC Pty Ltd (former Australian Submarine Corporation), a naval shipbuilder
 ASC Shipbuilding established by ASC Pty Ltd but now a subsidiary of BAE Systems Australia

Canada
 Advertising Standards Canada
 Agence spatiale canadienne, the Canadian Space Agency
 Alberta Securities Commission
 Association des Scouts du Canada

United Kingdom
 Amalgamated Society of Core Makers of Great Britain and Ireland, former trade union
 Army Service Corps, the name of the Royal Army Service Corps between 1870 and 1918
 Association of Speakers Clubs, a group of public speaking clubs

United States
 Accounting Standards Codification, an official publication of financial accounting standards known as Generally Accepted Accounting Principles
 Accredited Standards Committee, an organizational division of the American National Standards Institute
 ASC X9, responsible for standards for the financial services industry
 ASC X12, responsible for standards for business-to-business electronic data interchange
 Aeronautical Systems Center, inactivated Air Force product center
 Airflow Sciences Corporation, an engineering consulting company in Livonia, Michigan
 American Shakespeare Center, a theatre company in Staunton, Virginia
 American Signal Corporation, a Tornado Siren company founded in 1942
 American Society for Cybernetics, an American non-profit scholastic organization
 American Society of Cinematographers, members use postnominal letters ASC
 American Society of Criminology
 American Society of Cytopathology
 American Softworks Corporation (ASC Games, 1992–2000), a former video game publishing company
 American Southwest Conference, an athletic conference
 American Specialty Cars, an automobile parts manufacturer

International
 Adorers of the Blood of Christ
 Aquaculture Stewardship Council, non-profit organisation and ecolabel
 Anti-Spyware Coalition, against computer spyware
 Asian Socialist Conference

Elsewhere
 Indian Army Service Corps, India
 Afrika-Studiecentrum Leiden (African Studies Centre), Netherlands
 Army Service Corps, a unit of the Pakistan Army
 Aviation Safety Council (now the Taiwan Transportation Safety Board), Taiwan
 Assets Scrutiny Committee, former government agency

Science and technology
 Apoptosis-associated speck-like protein containing a CARD, a protein encoded by the PYCARD gene
 Application Session Controller, an element of a telecommunications network
 Arnhem Space Centre, a spaceport in northern Australia
 Autism spectrum condition, a form of neurodivergence

Automotive
 Active Stability Control, Mitsubishi Electronic Stability Control system
 Automatic Stability Control, BMW traction control system, used in motorcycles such as BMW R1200RT

Computing
 Additional Sense Code, extension to a Key Code Qualifier error-code returned by a SCSI device
 .asc, computer filename extension used for some ASCII text files, and Server-Side ActionScript
 Asynchronous serial communication
 Asynchronous serial controller, alternate name for universal asynchronous receiver/transmitter
 Australia Singapore Cable, submarine telecommunications cable
 TI Advanced Scientific Computer, 1966 supercomputer architecture

Other uses
 Admiralty Sailing Craft, a UK sailing dinghy
 After School Club, South Korean TV show
 Al Ahly SC, a sports club based in Cairo, Egypt
 Altered state of consciousness
 Ambulatory surgery center, healthcare facility
 American Solar Challenge, solar car race
 American Song Contest, an American music competition
 Ashchurch for Tewkesbury railway station (UK National Rail code)
 Asian Science Camp
 ASC (musician), a musician producing electronic music

See also
 
 
 ASK (disambiguation)